Jorge Alexander Rodas Hurtarte (born October 9, 1971) is a retired Guatemalan professional football midfielder. He last played for Aurora F.C. in the Guatemalan Primera División as of the end of the 2007-08 season.

Rodas was the first Guatemalan footballer to play in Major League Soccer, when he starred for San José Clash in 1996. He was also a member of the Guatemala national team.

He is the younger brother of Julio Rodas, who was also a member of the national team.

Club career
Rodas began playing professionally for Municipal of Guatemala City, where he became first known for his abilities as a central midfielder and his shooting range. After winning the 1993-94 league tournament with Municipal, he signed with their arch-rival, Comunicaciones, where he would be part of seven championship-winning squads.

Major League Soccer
In 1996, Rodas became the first Guatemalan to play professionally in the United States, when he was signed by San Jose Clash. He took the field in the first-ever Major League Soccer match on April 6. 1996, when The Clash beat D.C. United 1-0 at home. Alongside players like Eric Wynalda, John Doyle, and Eddie Lewis, Rodas helped San Jose reach the MLS playoffs that year. He played in 29 matches, made three assists, and scored one goal on a direct free kick against New England Revolution on August 11, catalogued in the San Jose Earthquakes 100 Greatest Goals DVD as the team's second-best goal of the year. After the inaugural MLS season, Rodas was transferred back to Communicaciones in January 1997.

Later career
Rodas would stay at Comunicaciones until 2002, and after that he played briefly for Xelajú MC. Later, he joined Deportivo Jalapa, achieving further success by helping the team win the Domestic Cup in consecutive years in 2005 and 2006; he scored the only goal of a 1-0 win over Municipal in the 2006 final. He had other notable individual performances at Jalapa, among them scoring a hat-trick against Deportivo Heredia in a 3-2 win on which the team advanced to the semi-final of the 2005 apertura tournament.

After his tenure with Jalapa ended in 2006, Rodas, aged 35, continued his career with a brief spell with Deportivo Mixco in the Primera División. For the 2007-08 season, he was signed by former top-division team Aurora F.C., which had been relegated to the Segunda División the previous season. Aurora earned promotion back to the Primera División for the 2008–2009 season.

International career
Rodas made his debut for Guatemala in a May 1991 UNCAF Nations Cup match against El Salvador alongside his brother Julio. Jorge Rodas earned 38 overall caps, scoring four goals, and represented his country in 12 FIFA World Cup qualification matches and was part of the squads that competed at the CONCACAF Gold Cup tournaments of 1996 and 2000, and at the UNCAF Nations Cup of 1995, 1997, and 1999. His final international was a January 2001 World Cup qualification match against Costa Rica.

International goals
Scores and results list. Guatemala's goal tally first.

See also
List of foreign MLS players

References

External links

1971 births
Living people
People from Jalapa Department
Association football midfielders
Guatemalan footballers
Guatemalan expatriate footballers
Guatemala international footballers
C.S.D. Municipal players
Comunicaciones F.C. players
San Jose Earthquakes players
Xelajú MC players
Aurora F.C. players
Major League Soccer players
Guatemalan expatriate sportspeople in the United States
Expatriate soccer players in the United States
1996 CONCACAF Gold Cup players
2000 CONCACAF Gold Cup players